Nuclear Terrorism: The Ultimate Preventable Catastrophe is a 2004 book by Harvard scholar Graham Allison.  Allison explains that terrorists have been striving to acquire and then use nuclear weapons against the United States. During the 2004 U.S. Presidential election, President George W. Bush and Senator John Kerry featured the issue of terrorism in their foreign policy platforms, and both said it is the nation's foremost security challenge. Nuclear Terrorism is described as a well-written report for general readers on the terrorist threat and what is needed to reduce it.

According to Warren Buffett in 2005:

See also
 List of books about nuclear issues
 On Nuclear Terrorism
 The Four Faces of Nuclear Terrorism
 The Seventh Decade

References

External links
  (16th Annual Margolis Lecture, given by Dr. Graham Allison at U.C. Irvine)

2004 non-fiction books
Books about politics of the United States
American political books
Nuclear terrorism
Books about nuclear issues
Books about terrorism